Karl Oliver Alba, also known as Dyzee (pronounced dizzy) (born 1979) is a professional b-boy (break dancer) from Toronto, Canada. He is recorded in the Guinness Book of World Records, holding the longest b-boy circle (24 hours straight). He is member of Supernaturalz and 7 Commandoz.

7 Commandoz

Documentary Appearances

Dyzee was one of the main characters in the motion picture BBoy documentary "All Out War"

In 2010, BBoy Dyzee appeared in an award-winning documentary about his work to create a scoring system for professional BBoy competitions.

References

1979 births
Living people
Canadian breakdancers
People from Toronto